Aparajit was the last of the Pallava kings of the Kanchi Kingdom in south India.  In 862 he defeated Varaguna Varman the king of Pandya at the Battle of Sri Purambiya.  However, before the end of the ninth century Aparajit was defeated by Aditya I and the Kanchi lands came under the rule of Chola. Pallavas had great contribution to Indian history.
They laid the foundation of Dravidian school of art.

Like other Pallava kings, Aparajit also built a famous Shivan Temple in Thiruttani, Tamil Nadu. This temple is famous for the arch type of Karpagraham (sanctuary). This temple is on the banks of the Nandhi river.

Sources 
Battacharya, Sachchidananda. A Dictionary of Indian History (Westport: Greenwood Press, 1977) pp. 58–59.

Pallava kings
9th-century rulers in Asia